The 1918 Georgia Eleventh Cavalry football team  represented the 11th Cavalry of Fort Oglethorpe in Fort Oglethorpe, Georgia during the 1918 college football season.  In their only known contest, the Cavalry team lost 123–0 to defending national champion Georgia Tech, which was riding a 30-game unbeaten streak.

Schedule

References

Georgia Eleventh Cavalry
Georgia Eleventh Cavalry football